Systrip is a visual environment for the analysis of time-series data in the context of biological networks.
Systrip gathers bioinformatics and graph theoretical algorithms that can be assembled in different ways to help biologists in their visual mining process. It had been used to analyze various real biological data.

Presentation 
Systrip is developed in C++ and is based on Tulip, an information visualization framework dedicated to the analysis and visualization of relational data.

The Model-View-Controller architecture of Tulip allows Systrip to support multiple and synchronized views. Any interaction on a view (e.g. selection of an element) implies the automatic update of all views displaying this data.
In addition to the algorithms and views developed specifically for Systrip, the Tulip plug-ins system allows Systrip users to access all its available plug-ins (plug-ins integrated in Tulip releases but also via Tulip plug-ins server).

Features 
Input
 Import and export metabolic network using the SBML format
 Time-series data from CSV file
 Import data from CSV file
 Load and save state of a session

Structure manipulation
 Pathways creation and removal
 Elements removal
 Sub-network creation and manipulation (Help user to focus on a small part of the network)

Visualization
 Multiple kind of metabolic network representations (3D, force directed, biological convention preserving, hierarchical ...)
 Visualization interaction tools (drawing, bends ...)
 Animation of time-series data
 Visualization of time-series in the context of the metabolic network
 Data analysis views (histogram, spreadsheet, scatter plot, parallel coordinates)
 3D molecular visualization

Analysis
 Tulip graph analysis algorithms
 Degree
 Betweenness centrality
 Eccentricity
 Strahler
 Network analysis algorithms
 Choke points
 Shortest path (dedicated to metabolic networks)
 Scope selection

References

External links 
 Systrip home page
 Tulip home page
 SBML format home page

Science software for Windows
Linux software